Kingsgrove railway station is located on the East Hills line, serving the Sydney suburb of Kingsgrove. It is served by Sydney Trains T8 Airport & South line services.

History
Kingsgrove station opened on 21 September 1931 when the East Hills line opened from Tempe to East Hills. It was the original terminus of the double track electrified section from Tempe. Until 1939, passengers transferred at Kinsgrove to a CPH railmotor or steam service to continue their journey towards East Hills. The line was duplicated and electrified beyond Kingsgrove in 1948.

In 2000, as part of the quadruplication of the line from Wolli Creek to just west of Kingsgrove station, through lines were added on either side of the existing pair. A headshunt was provided to the west of the station in association with this project, this is used by terminating services. In 2013, the quadruplication was extended to Revesby as part of the Rail Clearways Program.

Accident
On 6 October 2000, an eight car Tangara derailed at low speed near Kingsgrove station causing the rear three carriages to topple onto their side. The derailment was caused by a track buckling as a result of high temperatures. Ten people were hospitalised.

Platforms & services

Kingsgrove is typically served by 4 trains per hour in each direction, with increased frequencies during peak hours.

The station is accessible with one lift from the west side of Kingsgrove Road to the single island platform.

Transport links
Transdev NSW operates one route to and from Kingsgrove station:
455: to Rockdale Plaza via Kingsway West, Hurstville and Kogarah

Transit Systems operate three routes via Kingsgrove station:
490: Drummoyne to Hurstville via Five Dock, Burwood and Campsie
492: Drummoyne to Rockdale via Five Dock, Burwood and Campsie
493: Roselands Shopping Centre to Rockdale via Beverly Hills, Bexley North and Bexley

Kingsgrove station is served by one NightRide route:
N20: Riverwood station to Town Hall station via Narwee, Rockdale and Airport

Trackplan

References

External links

Kingsgrove station details Transport for New South Wales

Easy Access railway stations in Sydney
Railway stations in Sydney
Railway stations in Australia opened in 1931
Georges River Council
East Hills railway line